EURASIP Journal on Advances in Signal Processing is a peer-reviewed open access scientific journal covering theoretical and practical aspects of signal processing in new and emerging technologies. The scope includes: communications, networking, sensors and actuators, radar and sonar, medical imaging, biomedical applications, remote sensing, consumer electronics, computer vision, pattern recognition, robotics, fiber optic sensing/transducers, industrial automation, transportation, stock market and financial analysis, seismography, and avionics.

It is published by the EUSIPCO association.

External links 
 

Computer science journals
Open access journals
Publications established in 2001
English-language journals
Springer Science+Business Media academic journals